is a passenger railway station located in the city of Komatsushima, Tokushima Prefecture, Japan. It is operated by JR Shikoku and has the station number "M08".

Lines
Only local trains stop at the station.

Layout
The station consists of an island platform serving two tracks. The station building is unstaffed and serves only as a waiting room. Access to the island platform is by means of a level crossing and ramp.

Platforms

Adjacent stations

History
On 1 July 1936, the stretch of Anan Railway track from Chūden to Hanoura, including Tatsue, was nationalized. Japanese Government Railways (JGR) took over control of the station and operated it as part of the Mugi Line. On 1 April 1987, with the privatization of Japanese National Railways (JNR), the successor of JGR, control of the station passed to JR Shikoku.

Passenger statistics
In fiscal 2018, the station was used by an average of 224 passengers daily

Surrounding area
Komatsushima City Tatsue Elementary School
 Komatsushima City Tatsue Public Hall
 Tatsue-ji

See also
 List of Railway Stations in Japan

References

External links

 JR Shikoku official homepage

Railway stations in Tokushima Prefecture
Railway stations in Japan opened in 1916
Komatsushima, Tokushima